The 1926 Kars/Leninakan earthquake occurred at 21:59 local time on 22 October 1926 in the border area of Soviet Armenia and eastern Turkey. It had a surface wave magnitude of 6.0 and a maximum felt intensity of IX (Violent) on the Mercalli intensity scale, causing 360 casualties. Many buildings in Leninakan and surrounding villages were destroyed or damaged.

The Soviet investigation by the geologist Pyotr Lebedev, published in 1927, noted that the quake could be felt as far away as Yerevan, Tiflis, Batumi and even Sochi, and that aftershocks lasted for several days. He noted that up to 300 people were killed in the quake in Soviet Armenia, with about the same number seriously injured.

See also
 List of earthquakes in 1926
 List of earthquakes in Turkey
 List of earthquakes in Armenia

References

1926 Kars
Earthquakes in Armenia
Earthquakes in the Soviet Union
1926 in Turkey
1926 earthquakes
History of Kars Province
October 1926 events
1926 in the Soviet Union
1926 disasters in Turkey
1926 disasters in the Soviet Union